This is a list of notable people from Kayseri.

Born prior to 1900
 Hyacinth of Caesarea (96–108), Christian saint
 Absalon of Caesarea, Christian saint
 Leontius of Caesarea (died 337), bishop
 Basil of Caesarea (330–379), Greek bishop and Christian saint
 Emmelia of Caesarea (died c. 375), mother of Basil
 Helladius of Caesarea (fl. 381), bishop
 Andreas of Caesarea (563–637), Greek theologian and bishop
 Arethas of Caesarea (born c. 860), Byzantine scholar and archbishop
 Kadi Burhan al-Din (1345–1398), Turkish poet and statesman
 Konstantinos Adosidis (1818-1895), Ottoman-appointed Prince of Samos
 Theodoros Kasapis (1835-1905), Cappadocian Greek who played a key role in the reform movement

Born after 1900
Hulusi Akar, Former Chief of General Staff of Turkey and Current Minister of National Defense of Turkey
Deniz Akkaya, model
Göksel Arsoy, film actor
Pelin Gündeş Bakır, politician representing Kayseri
Sinan Bolat, footballer (goalkeeper)
Umut Bulut, footballer
Tuğba Daşdemir, alpine skier
Orhan Delibaş, boxer
Ebru Elhan, volleyball player
Mustafa Elitaş, politician representing Kayeri
Atilla Engin, jazz musician
Nazim Erdem, Australian wheelchair rugby player, born in Kayseri
A. Cemal Eringen, mechanician and engineering scientist
Derviş Eroğlu, president of the TRNC
Abdullah Gül, President of Turkey
Metin Kaçan, novelist
 Elia Kazan (1909-2003), Greek American film director whose family originated from Kayseri in Cappadocia
İhsan Ketin (1914 –1995) was a Turkish earth scientist
Zeynep Murat, European champion Taekwondo practitioner
Nesrin Nas, politician, leader of the Motherland Party (ANAP)
Celil Oker, writer
İsmet Özel, poet
Tuncay Özilhan, businessman
Ali Öztürk, footballer
Hüsnü Özyeğin, businessman
Erol Sabancı, businessman (Sabancı Holding)
Sakıp Sabancı, businessman (Sabancı Holding)
Şevket Sabancı, businessman (Sabancı Holding)
Mimar Sinan, architect
Fatih Solak, basketball player
Mehmet Topuz, footballer
Ali Turan, footballer
Alparslan Türkeş, politician
Taner Yıldız, politician representing Kayseri

References

 
Kayseri